The following is a list of broadcasters of the NHL Entry Draft.

2020s

2010s

2000s

1990s

1980s

References 

Broadcasters
NHL Draft broadcasters
NHL Draft Broadcasters
NHL Draft Broadcasters
NHL Draft Broadcasters
NHL Draft Broadcasters
NBCSN
Simulcasts